Rubén Ochandiano (born 3 October 1980) is a Spanish actor and director. He has appeared in more than thirty films since 1997. He has worked with some of the most interesting film directors over the world: Pedro Almodovar, Alejandro González Iñarritu, Steven Soderbergh among others. He has  also starred as Marcos in the teen spanish series Al salir de clase, a role he publicly disowned.

Selected filmography

References

External links 

1980 births
Living people
Spanish male film actors
Male actors from Madrid
21st-century Spanish male actors